The following is a list of Louisiana Ragin' Cajuns football seasons for the football team that has represented University of Louisiana at Lafayette in NCAA competition.

Season-by-season records

References

Louisiana

Louisiana Ragin' Cajuns football seasons